Cinerama Releasing Corporation (CRC) was a motion picture company established in 1967 that originally released films produced by its namesake parent company that was considered an "instant major".

History
In 1963, the owner of the Pacific Coast Theater chain, William R. Foreman, purchased Cinerama, Inc.  In 1966, CRC was set up to be an independent distributor of widescreen motion pictures produced by Cinerama, various foreign films and ABC Pictures, the film production unit of the American Broadcasting Company. CRC was only a distributor of films, without retaining copyright stake over each production. As an instant major by 1970, CRC reached a 10% market share. ABC Pictures ended operations in early 1973, thus CRC moved to primarily distributing non-financed films (acquisitions). By August 1974, CRC had released 125 acquired films at which time its productions and reissues were handled by American International Pictures. Cinerama, Inc., CRC's parent company, was liquidated in May 1978 with the Cinerama name ending up being owned by Pacific Coast Theater.

Films released

See also
Major film studios
National General Pictures, another instant major
Commonwealth United, a sometimes instant major

References

Cook, David A. (2000). Lost Illusions: American Cinema in the Shadow of Watergate and Vietnam, 1970-1979. University of California Press.

Entertainment companies established in 1967
Mass media companies established in 1967
Companies disestablished in 1974
Cinerama
Film distributors of the United States
Film production companies of the United States
Defunct American film studios
Cinema of Southern California
Entertainment companies based in California
Companies based in Los Angeles
1967 establishments in California
1974 disestablishments in California
Defunct companies based in Greater Los Angeles